This is a comprehensive listing of official releases by Lovex, a rock band from Tampere, Finland. Lovex has released four studio albums, 1 best of compilations, 11 singles, and 5 music videos on its record labels EMI and Gun Records.

Albums

Studio albums

Singles

Music videos

Discographies of Finnish artists
Rock music group discographies